Hayley Danielle McCall (born March 14, 1992) is an American professional soccer defender. She played for Sky Blue FC of the NWSL.

Early life
Haagsma attended Valley Christian High School  in Cerritos, California.

Playing career

Texas Tech Red Raiders
Hayes attended Texas Tech University, where she played for the Red Raiders.

Professional

Sky Blue FC
Haagsma signed with Sky Blue FC for the 2014 season with an option for the 2015 season. During the first 2014 preseason game her ACL tore, sidelining her for the 2014 NWSL season.

In February 2016, she retired from professional soccer.

See also

References

External links
 Hayley Haagsma profile at National Women's Soccer League
 Hayley Haagsma profile at Sky Blue FC

Women's association football midfielders
Living people
American women's soccer players
NJ/NY Gotham FC players
National Women's Soccer League players
1992 births
Women's association football defenders
Texas Tech Red Raiders women's soccer players
NJ/NY Gotham FC draft picks